Dasydactylus is a genus of lizard beetles in the family Erotylidae. There is one described species in Dasydactylus, D. cnici.

References

Further reading

 
 

Erotylidae
Articles created by Qbugbot